Ili Bolagh (also Romanized as Īlī Bolāgh; also known as Īglī Bolāgh) is a village in Mah Neshan Rural District of the Central District of Mahneshan County, Zanjan province, Iran. At the 2006 National Census, its population was 870 in 196 households. The following census in 2011 counted 1,038 people in 256 households. The latest census in 2016 showed a population of 1,155 people in 348 households; it was the largest village in its rural district.

References 

Mahneshan County

Populated places in Zanjan Province

Populated places in Mahneshan County